"Space" is a song by English singer Becky Hill. The track was released by labels Polydor Records and Eko Records on 2 October 2020. The song was written by Hill herself, alongside Josh Record, Mark Ralph, and both members of CamelPhat and produced by the latter two. The song peaked at number seventy-nine on the UK Singles Chart. Her debut studio album, Only Honest on the Weekend, is derived from a lyric in this song which was ultimately cut out from the final tracklist, but was later included in the deluxe version of the album.

Music video
A music video to accompany the release of "Space" was first released onto YouTube on 2 October 2020.

Track listing

Personnel
Credits adapted from Tidal.
 David Whelan – Producer, composer, lyricist, associated performer, music production, programming
 Mark Ralph – Producer, composer, lyricist, associated performer, music production, programming
 Michael Di Scala – Producer, composer, lyricist, associated performer, music production, programming
 Josh Record – Composer, lyricist
 Rebecca Claire Hill – Composer, lyricist, associated performer, vocals
 Matt Wolach – Assistant Mixer, studio personnel
 Ryan Ashley – Associated Performer, vocal producer
 Chris Gehringer – Mastering Engineer, studio personnel
 Mark "Spike" Stent – Mixer, studio personnel

Charts

Release history

References

2020 songs
2020 singles
Becky Hill songs
Songs written by Becky Hill
Songs written by Mark Ralph (record producer)
Song recordings produced by Mark Ralph (record producer)